Abdul Fatah Haqqani (died April 19, 2011) was a citizen of Afghanistan who was held in the Bagram Internment Facility, and was subsequently killed by US forces.

He was killed on April 19, 2011, by a precision air strike in Burkah district, Baghlan Province.
The US claimed he commanded both Taliban forces, and elements of the Islamic Movement of Uzbekistan.

References

Afghan prisoners and detainees
2011 deaths
Year of birth missing
Place of birth missing
Bagram Theater Internment Facility detainees
Deaths by American airstrikes